The Sŏngp'yŏng Line was a non-electrified  long railway line of the Korean State Railway in North Korea, connecting Kangalli on the Hambuk Line with Sŏngp'yŏng.

History
The line was originally opened by the privately owned Tomun Railway as a branch of its Hoeryŏng−Tonggwanjin mainline, subsequently becoming part of the Chosen Government Railway after the nationalisation of the Tomun Railway in 1929. The line was dismantled sometime after the mid 1980s, but the exact date of closure is unknown.

Services
Until the 1980s, coal was shipped from mines on this line to the Kim Chaek Iron & Steel Complex at Kimchaek and the Ch'ŏngjin Steel Works in Ch'ŏngjin, with the order of collection from each line arranged in the order of the total weight of the outbound cars.

Route 

A yellow background in the "Distance" box indicates that section of the line is not electrified.

References

Railway lines in North Korea
Standard gauge railways in North Korea